Ahn Seon-tae (born 12 May 1983) is a South Korean former footballer who plays as defender. He retired after 2013 season.

References
 Ahn Seon-Tae at n-league.net 

1983 births
Living people
Association football forwards
South Korean footballers
Gyeongnam FC players
Changwon City FC players
Korean Police FC (Semi-professional) players
Korea National League players
K League 1 players
Myongji University alumni